The 2nd Cavalry Division (2. Kavallerie-Division) was a unit of the Reichswehr, the armed forces of Germany during the Weimar Republic.

It consisted of 6 cavalry regiments, the 7th, 8th, 9th, 10th and 11th (Prussian) Cavalry Regiments and the 12th (Saxon) Cavalry Regiment.

Its commanders were:

Generalleutnant Otto von Preinitzer 1 June 1920 - 1 April 1922
General of the Infantry Ernst Hasse 1 April 1922 - 1 January 1925
General of the Cavalry Hugo von Kayser 1 January 1925 - 1 October 1926
Generalleutnant Richard von Graberg 1 October 1926 - 1 October 1928
General of the Infantry Gerd von Rundstedt 1 October 1928 - 1 February 1932
Generalmajor Paul Ludwig Ewald von Kleist 1 February 1932 - 21 May 1935

It was subordinated to Gruppenkommando 1.

External links

 Feldgrau.com

Cavalry divisions of Germany
Military units and formations established in 1920
Military units and formations disestablished in 1935